Chiyako Satō (佐藤千夜子 Satō Chiyako) was a Japanese singer.

Biography 
The Japanese singer Chiyako Satō (real name Chiyo Satō 佐藤千代 Satō Chiyo) was born in Tendō, Yamagata in 1897.

After graduating the Tokyo Music School (a precursor to the modern Tokyo University of the Arts her musical talents were recognized by the poet Ujō Noguchi (野口雨情) and the composer Shinpei Nakayama.

In 1930, she went to study in Italy, but upon returning to Japan in 1935 she was unable to reclaim her position in the Japanese show business world. She died in obscurity in 1968.

References

Citations

Works cited 

 

1897 births
1968 deaths
Japanese women singers